Mahendra Nath Singh is an Indian politician. He was elected to the Lok Sabha, the lower house of the Parliament of India as a member of the Indian National Congress.

References

External links
Official biographical sketch in Parliament of India website

India MPs 1952–1957
India MPs 1957–1962
Lok Sabha members from Bihar
Year of birth missing
Year of death missing